Butua may refer to:

 Kingdom of Butua, pre-colonial African state
 Butua (Ancient Rome), Roman city located at today's Budva, Montenegro